Maine Cottage is a privately held American furniture company specializing in high-end coastal cottage style furniture. Their product line includes painted solid wood, wicker and upholstered furniture. Customers can customize their furniture by selecting from exclusive paint colors and signature fabric patterns.
 
Started in Yarmouth, Maine in the United States, the operation is now fully run and operated out of Annapolis, Maryland. Their products ship worldwide, and are available online and through a direct mail catalog.

History
The company was founded in 1988 by Peter Bass and artist Carol Bass. It was originally located in Yarmouth, Maine in a restored cannery on the Royal River. Bass is the great grandson of Wilton, Maine shoe maker G.H. Bass.

Maine Cottage was the first company to offer American Country, Early Shaker, and Mid Century Modern-inspired painted wood furniture in a multitude of original colors. The idea originated with artist Carol Bass painting and selling "found" pieces of cottage furniture. The company then began to design furniture and paint its own custom pieces. Maine Cottage expanded its product line with the introduction of their textile line in 2000, producing colorful whimsical patterns for use on their nostalgic upholstery and wicker furniture lines.

Russell & Mackenna
 In 2001, as Maine Cottage was continuing expansion efforts a competing furniture company called Russell & Mackenna was launched. Russell & Mackenna got its start after Lauren and Kevin Russell began designing and building furniture in their Severna Park, Maryland garage. Lauren's father, Larry Strassner, was recruited in 2004 to help with financial and operational aspects of the business freeing Lauren to focus on designing for and marketing the company. When Russell & Mackenna outgrew their garage manufacturing,  they employed artisan furniture builders in Delaware to continue the bench-built, made-to-order method of production. When their signature piece, the High Tide Hall Table, was featured in Coastal Living Magazine the brand gained a loyal following nationwide.
 In 2006, Russell & Mackenna launched an upholstered furniture line adding a playful element to their painted furniture collection with bright colors and cheerful prints.
 By 2009, under Strassner's leadership, Russell & Mackenna was a multimillion-dollar business. Designs were sold direct-to-consumer and specified by members of the trade in coastal inspired homes around the country.
 In 2011, Maine Cottage was in financial distress and faced foreclosure. Russell & Mackenna acted quickly and acquired the intellectual property of their competitor, Maine Cottage. Product lines were merged and the resulting company continued to run operations as Maine Cottage.

Coastal Brands
In January 2016, Maine Cottage merged with outdoor furniture company Thos. Baker and created a parent company called Coastal Brands headquartered on Bainbridge Island, off the coast of Seattle, Washington. Larry Strassner resigned from Maine Cottage while his daughter, Lauren Russell, remained on as the Chief Creative Officer for the Brand. John Thomas Baker IV took over as Chairman and CEO. During Baker’s tenure, the business focused on growing the direct mail catalog channel and looking for growth capital.

Balsam Brands
In January 2018, Baker, along with 21 shareholders, sold Coastal Brands to Balsam Brands in Redwood City, California. Balsam Hill, the artificial Christmas Tree company, is the flagship brand of Balsam Brands. CEO, Thomas Harman kept Maine Cottage operations in Annapolis with Lauren Russell in charge of all creative aspects of the business, and Sarah Wright  in charge of all operational aspects. Balsam Brands is a artificial Christmas tree and home decor company owned by Thomas Mac Harman, graduate of Williams College in Massachusetts.

Bespoke Color Co.
In October of 2019, Lauren Russell and Sarah Wright formed Bespoke Color Company and bought back the Maine Cottage brand. The two women have worked together as part of the management team for eleven years and through all three acquisitions. Together they currently act as Co-Presidents of the Maine Cottage brand, with operations in Annapolis, MD and made-to-order furniture.

Sales Channels
Today Maine Cottage operates an interactive e-commerce website and maintains a design blog.  Along with the digital channel, the company produces a coffee table style catalog, coined its “Color Book.” The first catalog, printed in 1989, featured 5 pieces of furniture and 3 paint colors. Generally the Color Book is produced every other year and was most recently published in 2019. The company also produces standard direct mail catalogs, which had an annual distribution of 850K copies in 2019.

Products

Maine Cottage product lines include furniture, home decor accessories, signature fabrics, and exclusive paint colors. Their furniture lines include solid painted wood furniture, upholstered furniture, and wicker furniture. Painted furniture is bench built to order and painted in wood shops in Maine, West Virginia and Delaware.  Hardwoods used in the furniture are Maple, Cherry and quarter-sawn Oak are milled nearby each wood shop using trees that are indigenous to the region. Painted furniture includes beds, dressers, chairs, tables and bath vanities.  In-house designers create and work within a palette of 46 paint colors, available on every painted piece of wood and wicker furniture. Their upholstered furniture, including sofas, loveseats, armchairs and ottomans, is crafted to order in North Carolina. Signature pattern fabrics are designed exclusively by Maine Cottage, based upon the paint palette so the upholstered furniture coordinates with the painted pieces. Frames are made of 5/4", or thicker, kiln-dried select hardwoods with joints that are double-doweled, glued and block reinforced for extra strength. Wicker furniture is hand-woven in Manila in the Philippines. Currently their home decor offerings include rugs, mirrors, hooks, artwork, and lighting.

Maine Cottage furniture is principally manufactured in the United States. Signature furniture designs include the fiddlehead side table, introduced in 1998, the Inga Trestle Dining Table, introduced in 2003 and the low tide hall table, introduced in 2008. Exclusive printed patterns include Rambler, Really Rosie and Lotsa Dots.

Maine Cottage furniture has been shipped to consumers across the US, Canada, Europe, and Australia.

Press
Maine Cottage furniture can be found in the homes of celebrities such as Gwyneth Paltrow, Conan O’Brien, Joanna Garcia Swisher and Nick Swisher, Chad Smith and Nancy Mack Smith. Their furniture has been featured in national publications such as Coastal Living, HGTV Magazine, House Beautiful, and Better Homes & Gardens Magazine.

References

Furniture companies of the United States
Manufacturing companies based in Maryland
Manufacturing companies established in 1988
1988 establishments in Maine
Companies based in Cumberland County, Maine
Yarmouth, Maine